G-protein-signaling modulator 2, also called LGN for its 10 Leucine-Glycine-Asparagine repeats, is a protein that in humans is encoded by the GPSM2 gene.

Function 

Heterotrimeric G proteins transduce extracellular signals received by cell surface receptors into integrated cellular responses. GPSM2 belongs to a group of proteins that modulate activation of G proteins (Blumer et al., 2002).[supplied by OMIM]

Interactions 

GPSM2 has been shown to interact with nuclear mitotic apparatus protein 1 and GNAI2.

References

Further reading

External links